Gusher is an unincorporated community in Uintah County, Utah, United States.

References

Unincorporated communities in Uintah County, Utah
Unincorporated communities in Utah